The 1818 New Hampshire gubernatorial election was held on March 10, 1818.

Incumbent Democratic-Republican Governor William Plumer defeated Federalist nominees Jeremiah Mason and William Hale.

General election

Candidates
William Hale, Federalist, former U.S. Representative
Jeremiah Mason, Federalist, former U.S. Senator
William Plumer, Democratic-Republican, incumbent Governor

Results

Notes

References

1818
New Hampshire
Gubernatorial